Liu Xiaolong (born 12 May 1988) is a Chinese badminton player who is a doubles specialist. A left handler, he is the former winner of the All England Championships. He was part of China winning team at the 2013 Sudirman Cup. He announced his retirement on international tournament on 26 June 2017.

Achievements

BWF World Championships 
Men's doubles

Asian Championships 
Men's doubles

BWF World Junior Championships 
Boys' doubles

Mixed doubles

Asian Junior Championships 
Mixed doubles

BWF Superseries 
The BWF Superseries, which was launched on 14 December 2006 and implemented in 2007, was a series of elite badminton tournaments, sanctioned by the Badminton World Federation (BWF). BWF Superseries levels were Superseries and Superseries Premier. A season of Superseries consisted of twelve tournaments around the world that had been introduced since 2011. Successful players were invited to the Superseries Finals, which were held at the end of each year.

Men's doubles

  BWF Superseries Finals tournament
  BWF Superseries Premier tournament
  BWF Superseries tournament

BWF Grand Prix 
The BWF Grand Prix had two levels, the Grand Prix and Grand Prix Gold. It was a series of badminton tournaments sanctioned by the Badminton World Federation (BWF) and played between 2007 and 2017.

Men's doubles

  BWF Grand Prix Gold tournament
  BWF Grand Prix tournament

References

External links 

 
 

1988 births
Living people
Sportspeople from Zhangzhou
Badminton players from Fujian
Chinese male badminton players
Badminton players at the 2014 Asian Games
Asian Games medalists in badminton
Asian Games silver medalists for China
Medalists at the 2014 Asian Games